The Woman in Black is a 1989 British horror drama television film directed by Herbert Wise and starring Adrian Rawlins, Bernard Hepton, David Daker and Pauline Moran. The teleplay is adapted from the 1983 novel of the same name by Susan Hill. It focuses on a young solicitor who is sent to a coastal English village to settle the estate of a reclusive widow, and finds the town haunted.

The programme was produced by Central Independent Television for the ITV Network, and premiered on Christmas Eve 1989 and was an unexpected success, though author Susan Hill reportedly disagreed with some of the slight changes screenwriter Nigel Kneale made in the adaptation. Another film version was released in 2012, starring Daniel Radcliffe in the lead role.

Plot
In 1925, London solicitor Arthur Kidd travels to the coastal market town of Crythin Gifford on England's east coast to attend the funeral and settle the estate of Alice Drablow, a reclusive widow. Upon his arrival Kidd meets Sam Toovey, a local land owner who is unsettled to hear of the Drablows. Kidd finds the townspeople reluctant to talk about Drablow's home, Eel Marsh House.

Kidd attends the funeral with local solicitor Pepperell. He notices a woman in black in the church, then again amid the gravestones. He mentions the woman to Pepperell. Elsewhere, a truck drops lumber and cripples a Romani child.

Kidd goes to Eel Marsh House over a tidal causeway. Driver Keckwick knows the timing of the tides.

Kidd sees the woman again in the graveyard. Terrified, he flees into the house. While looking around the study, he finds two death certificates as well as pictures of a young woman who resembles the Woman in Black. After hearing some disturbing recordings made by Mrs. Drablow on wax cylinders, he heads back to town.

In town, Toovey tells him not to go back to the house, but Kidd insists on returning. Toovey loans Kidd his dog Spider.

Upon his return, Kidd hears a bouncing ball from upstairs. Spider starts whining and leads Kidd to a door that cannot be opened. Kidd gets an axe to break the door, returning to find the door has opened by itself.

Kidd sees an immaculately clean child's nursery. Kidd notices that a lead soldier is somehow in his hand. He realizes that the generator is running down. Unwilling to be left in the dark, Kidd rushes outside toward the generator.

Outside, Spider answers a high whistle and runs away. The noise of the horse and child start again. Kidd, frightened almost into madness, rushes to lock himself into the house. He records his fears onto the wax cylinders.

From various sources inside the study, Kidd learns that Mrs. Drablow's sister, Jennet Goss, gave birth to a child but was unable to care for it. The Drablows adopted the boy, insisting he should never know that Jennet was his mother. One day, Jennet kidnapped her son and tried to escape via the causeway. The pony and trap became lost and sank into the marshes, killing all aboard.

Toovey arrives at Eel Marsh House, brought by Spider, and listens to Kidd's theories. Toovey says that seeing the Woman in Black presages the death of a child. Kidd packs to leave. However, amongst the papers, he finds the lead soldier. He points this out to Toovey, and they go up to the nursery. However, when they reach it, the room is a mess, with all the toys smashed and the furniture in shambles. Kidd collapses.

Kidd awakens in the town inn to the sound of the child's laughter and finds the soldier yet again in his hand. After asking out loud what the child wants of him, the child replies that the soldier "is for you". The Woman in Black appears, hovering over his bed, and shrieks into his face, terrifying him into unconsciousness.

Kidd returns to London and his family. His boss instructs him to look through the box of papers from Crythin Gifford. At that moment, his two assistants come in and say that there was a customer for him, a woman dressed completely in black. Delirious with terror, Kidd searches madly through the box for the toy soldier. When he does not find it, he burns all the papers and the box, and half his office as well. His boss fires him and the Kidd family leaves London.

Later, Arthur and his family are boating on a peaceful lake when Arthur sees the Woman in Black. Petrified, he does nothing. A tree falls on their boat, drowning and killing them all.

Cast

Production
The programme was filmed at Stanlake Park in Berkshire, using the causeway to Osea Island, near Goldhanger in Essex, and the local salt marshes, whilst scenes to represent Crythin Gifford were filmed at the National Trust village of Lacock, near Chippenham, Wiltshire. The external funeral scene was filmed in Sarratt, Hertfordshire.

Release

Broadcast history
The film was first broadcast in the United Kingdom on ITV on Christmas Eve 1989, with the only repeat airing taking place on Channel 4 at Christmas 1994. Overall the TV adaptation stayed reasonably faithful to the original novel, although some of the changes angered the author Susan Hill (for example, the sex of the dog 'Spider' was changed from female to male). Arthur's name has also been changed from Kipps to Kidd.

Distribution dispute
A dispute over the distribution rights in the United Kingdom between Central Television and three of the films original production team (who all owned a share) prevented the film from being either re-shown on television after 1994 or re-released on home media after 1991.  Susan Hill herself did not own any part of the rights to the television film. The distribution rights became further complicated when the 2012 Hammer film version went into production.

Home media
The TV version was originally released on VHS in the United Kingdom on 25 June 1990 by Futuristic Entertainment.  It was re-released on VHS on 1 April 1991 by Video Collection International as an exclusive to WHSmith stores, but only for a fairly short time before becoming an out-of-print title.

There was also a North American release on Region 1 DVD by BFS Entertainment, on 8 August 2000, which is also now out-of-print.  The US television rights have since been purchased twice and currently reside with a U.S. studio.

In the United Kingdom, Network Distributing were eventually able to secure the rights to re-release the film on both Blu-Ray and DVD on 12 October 2020. The film for this release was restored and remastered in high-definition from the original film elements and features extras including a booklet, full screen and widescreen presentations and audio commentary by authors Mark Gatiss, Andy Nyman and Kim Newman.

Critical reception
In his book Creature Features: The Science Fiction, Fantasy, and Horror Movie Guide (2000), John Stanley wrote that the film was a "chilly British ghost story in the best literary traditions of H. R. Wakefield and M. R. James... [it] has moments that will freeze your bone marrow." Lisa Kerrigan of the British Film Institute noted that the film "makes for a spine-tingling viewing experience." In 2011, Complex named the film the fourteenth-best television film of all time, noting that it "disturbs right down to its unbelievably downbeat ending."

Awards and nominations
The Woman in Black was nominated for four BAFTA awards, including Best Design, Best Film Sound, Best Make Up and Best Original Television Music.

See also
List of ghost films

References

Works cited

External links

 

1989 television films
1989 films
1989 drama films
1989 horror films
1980s British films
1980s English-language films
1980s horror drama films
British drama television films
British haunted house films
British horror drama films
British horror television films
British supernatural television shows
English-language television shows
Films based on British horror novels
Films directed by Herbert Wise
Films scored by Rachel Portman
Films set in 1925
Films set in country houses
Films set in England
Films shot in England
ITV television dramas
Period horror films
Television films based on books